The Grind was a dance music show broadcast on the cable television station MTV between 1992 and 1997.

It replaced Club MTV, and featured people dancing to music tracks in a studio, linked by various hosts, including Eric Nies (fresh from  The Real World: New York) and DJ Jackie Christie. While Club MTV was mostly Dance, House and Freestyle, The Grind featured Hip-Hop and Rap with an occasional Dance hit. The show spawned a number of aerobics and workout videotapes.

When MTV moved to its current location at 1515 Broadway, they lost the studio where Club MTV and The Grind were originally taped and episodes were taped on the roof of the building. The new space was small and inclement weather prevented taping. Noise ordinances prevented playing loud music while taping outdoors, so the show had to be taped without music and dubbed in later. Other installments went to Zuma Beach in California, Brooklyn, Miami and Hawaii.

Nies was replaced in 1995 by various guest hosts. Until the show was cancelled in the summer of 1998, it was re-branded with a sleeker look as The Daily Burn and was taped on the Jersey Shore. Michael Bergin and Tsianina Joelson co-hosted with DJ Skribble as the DJ.

See also 
 MTV Grind 1

References

External links 
 

1992 American television series debuts
1997 American television series endings
MTV original programming
Dance television shows
1990s American music television series
English-language television shows